Bandung United Football Club is an Indonesian football club based in Bandung, West Java that competes in Liga 3, the third tier of Indonesian football. The club was founded in 2019 after the takeover of Blitar United by PT. Persib Bandung Bermartabat and its subsequent relocation to Bandung. It is the feeder club of Persib Bandung and holds its home matches at Siliwangi Stadium.

History
Bandung United was formed in 2019 after PT. Persib Bandung Bermartabat (PBB) bought Blitar United's license and relocated their homebase to Bandung, making it the feeder club of Persib Bandung. In its first season, the club finished 12th in the West Region of Liga 2, sending it down to Liga 3 where it will compete with fellow Persib satellite team, Maung Anom.

Players

Current squad

References

External links
 
 

Bandung
Sport in West Java
Football clubs in West Java
Football clubs in Indonesia
Association football clubs established in 2019
2019 establishments in Indonesia